"" is an Old Irish poem, written in about the 9th century at or near Reichenau Abbey, in what is now Germany, by an  Irish monk about his cat. , 'White Pangur', is the cat's name,  possibly meaning 'a fuller'. Although the poem is anonymous, it bears similarities to the poetry of Sedulius Scottus, prompting speculation that he is the author. In eight verses of four lines each, the author compares the cat's happy hunting with his own scholarly pursuits.

The poem is preserved in the Reichenau Primer (Stift St. Paul Cod. 86b/1 fol 1v) and now kept in St. Paul's Abbey in the Lavanttal.

Background
The poem is found in only one manuscript, the Reichenauer Schulheft or Reichenau Primer. The primer appears to be the notebook of an Irish monk based in Reichenau Abbey. The contents of the primer are diverse, it also contains "notes from a commentary of the Aeneid, some hymns, a brief glossary of Greek words, some Greek declension, notes on biblical places, a tract on the nature of angels, and some astronomy".

Poem

Modern use
A critical edition of the poem was published in 1903 by Whitley Stokes and John Strachan in the second volume of the Thesaurus Palaeohibernicus. Among modern writers to have translated the poem are Robin Flower, W. H. Auden, Seamus Heaney, Paul Muldoon and Eavan Boland. In Auden's translation, the poem was set by Samuel Barber as the eighth of his ten Hermit Songs (1952–53).

Fay Sampson wrote a series of books based on the poem.  They follow the adventures of Pangur Bán, his friend, Niall the monk, and Finnglas, a Welsh princess.

In the 2009 animated movie The Secret of Kells, which is heavily inspired by Irish mythology, one of the supporting characters is a white cat named Pangur Bán who arrives in the company of a monk. A paraphrase of the poem in modern Irish is read out during the credit roll by actor and Irish speaker, Mick Lally.

Irish-language singer Pádraigín Ní Uallacháin recorded the poem in her 2011 studio album Songs of the Scribe, featuring both the original text and a translation by Nobel laureate Seamus Heaney. The poem was read, first in Irish then in Heaney’s translation into English, by Tomás Ó Cathasaigh at the memorial service held for Heaney at the Memorial Church, Harvard University on 7 November 2013.

In 2016, Jo Ellen Bogart and Sydney Smith published a picture book called The White Cat and the Monk based on the poem.

Dutch band Twigs & Twine used parts of the poem in their song "Messe ocus Pangur Bán".

In 2022, Irish writer Colm Tóibín published his own version of the poem in a collection titled Vinegar Hill.

First described in 2022, Pangurban, a genus of nimravid from Eocene California, is named for the cat in the poem.

See also
 Early Irish literature
 The Secret of Kells
 List of individual cats

Notes

References

"Irish - Pangur Bán". Dpartment of Anglo-Saxon Norse and Celtic. University of Cambridge. Retrieved 28 February2020.

External links
 Original text and spoken version
 The Original Old Irish text of Pangur Bán(Wayback Machine Archived page) 

 Pangur Ban, Cats in History
 Robin Flower's translation
 W. H. Auden's translation
 Seamus Heaney's translation
 4 parallel translations

Irish poems
Early Irish literature
Individual cats
Medieval poetry
Cats in literature